Sant'Agata Fossili is a comune (municipality) in the Province of Alessandria in the Italian region Piedmont, located about  southeast of Turin and about  southeast of Alessandria.

Sant'Agata Fossili borders the following municipalities: Carezzano, Cassano Spinola, Castellania Coppi, Sardigliano.

References

Cities and towns in Piedmont